Bucculatrix similis is a moth in the family Bucculatricidae. It was described by Svetlana Vladimirovna Baryshnikova in 2005. It is found in Russia.

References

Natural History Museum Lepidoptera generic names catalog

Bucculatricidae
Moths described in 2005
Moths of Asia